Deane Anthony Pieters (born 30 July 1968) is a freestyle swimmer who competed for Australia at the 1992 Summer Olympics in Barcelona, Spain. There he was disqualified in the final of the men's 4×200-metre freestyle relay team, alongside Kieren Perkins, Duncan Armstrong and Ian Brown.

At the 1991 Pan Pacific Swimming Championships in Edmonton, Pieters won a silver medal in the 4x200-metre freestyle. He also finished 4th in the 200-metre freestyle, 10th in the 400-metre freestyle, and 28th in the 100-metre freestyle.

At the 1993 Pan Pacific Swimming Championships in Kobe, Japan, Pieters again won a silver medal in the 4x200-metre freestyle. He also finished 11th in the 200-metre freestyle, and 23rd in the 100-metre freestyle.

Deane is a World Life Saving Champion (1990) and has won eight Australian Surf Life Saving Titles between 1990 and 1993.

He has represented Australia in swimming (1991, 1992 and 1993) and surf life saving (1990, 1991 and 1996).

Deane is general manager of business strategy and growth for the West Coast Eagles football club and formerly held the position of general manager marketing from 2001 to 2010, spanning a period of drug controversies centred on the Eagles' playing list.

Deane is a graduate of the Stanford Executive Program as part of the Graduate School of Business, Stanford University, California, USA. Deane is also a graduate member of the Australia Institute of Company Directors (GAICD).

In 2010 at the age of 41, Pieters won the Rottnest Channel Swim in a time of 4 hours, 41 minutes and 35 seconds, going one better from his 2009 result.

External links
 Australian Olympic Committee

References

1968 births
Living people
Australian male freestyle swimmers
Olympic swimmers of Australia
Swimmers at the 1992 Summer Olympics
Sportsmen from Western Australia
Swimmers from Perth, Western Australia
20th-century Australian people